The Ganges (in India: Ganga; in Bangladesh: Padma) is a trans-boundary river of Asia which flows through Bangladesh and India. The  river rises in the western Himalayas in the Indian state of Uttarakhand. It flows south and east through the Gangetic plain of North India, receiving the right-bank tributary, the Yamuna, which also rises in the western Indian Himalayas, and several left-bank tributaries from Nepal that account for the bulk of its flow. In West Bengal state, India, a feeder canal taking off from its right bank diverts 50% of its flow southwards, artificially connecting it to the Hooghly river.  The Ganges continues into Bangladesh, its name changing to the Padma. It is then joined by the Jamuna, the lower stream of the Brahmaputra, and eventually the Meghna, forming the major estuary of the Ganges Delta, and emptying into the Bay of Bengal. The Ganges-Brahmaputra-Meghna system is the second largest river on earth by discharge.

The main stem of the Ganges begins at the town of Devprayag, at the confluence of the Alaknanda, which is the source stream in hydrology on account of its greater length, and the Bhagirathi, which is considered the source stream in Hindu Mythology.

The Ganges is a lifeline to millions of people who live in its basin and depend on it for their daily needs. It has been important historically, with many former provincial or imperial capitals such as Pataliputra, Kannauj, Kara, Munger, Kashi, Patna, Hajipur, Delhi, Bhagalpur, Murshidabad, Baharampur, Kampilya, and Kolkata located on its banks or the banks of tributaries and connected waterways. The river is home to approximately 140 species of fish, 90 species of amphibians, and also reptiles and mammals, including critically endangered species such as the gharial and South Asian river dolphin. The Ganges is the most sacred river to Hindus. It is worshipped as the goddess Ganga in Hinduism.

The Ganges is threatened by severe pollution. This poses a danger not only to humans but also to animals. The levels of fecal coliform bacteria from human waste in the river near Varanasi are more than a hundred times the Indian government's official limit. The Ganga Action Plan, an environmental initiative to clean up the river, has been considered a failure which is variously attributed to corruption, a lack of will in the government, poor technical expertise, poor environmental planning and a lack of support from  religious authorities.

Course 

The upper phase of the river Ganges begins at the confluence of the Bhagirathi and Alaknanda rivers in the town of Devprayag in the Garhwal division of the Indian state of Uttarakhand. The Bhagirathi is considered to be the source in Hindu culture and mythology, although the Alaknanda is longer, and therefore, hydrologically the source stream. The headwaters of the Alakananda are formed by snow melt from peaks such as Nanda Devi, Trisul, and Kamet.

Although many small streams comprise the headwaters of the Ganges, the six longest and their five confluences are considered sacred. The six headstreams are the Alaknanda, Dhauliganga, Nandakini, Pindar, Mandakini and Bhagirathi. Their confluences, known as the Panch Prayag, are all along the Alaknanda. They are, in downstream order, Vishnuprayag, where the Dhauliganga joins the Alaknanda; Nandprayag, where the Nandakini joins; Karnaprayag, where the Pindar joins; Rudraprayag, where the Mandakini joins; and finally, Devprayag, where the Bhagirathi joins the Alaknanda to form the Ganges.

After flowing for  through its narrow Himalayan valley, the Ganges emerges from the mountains at Rishikesh, then debouches onto the Gangetic Plain at the pilgrimage town of Haridwar. At Haridwar, a dam diverts some of its waters into the Ganges Canal, which irrigates the Doab region of Uttar Pradesh, whereas the river, whose course has been roughly southwest until this point, now begins to flow southeast through the plains of northern India.

The Ganges river follows a  arching course passing through the cities of Kannauj, Farukhabad, and Kanpur.

The Kosi is the third largest tributary of the Ganges by discharge, after Ghaghara (Karnali) and Yamuna. The Kosi merges into the Ganges near Kursela in Bihar.

Along the way between Allahabad and Malda, West Bengal, the Ganges river passes the towns of Chunar, Mirzapur, Varanasi, Ghazipur, Ara, Patna, Chapra, Hajipur, Mokama, Begusarai, Munger, Sahibganj, Rajmahal, Bhagalpur, Ballia, Buxar, Simaria, Sultanganj, and Farakka. Just before the border with Bangladesh the Farakka Barrage controls the flow of Ganges, diverting some of the water into a feeder canal linked to the Hooghly for the purpose of keeping it relatively silt-free. The Hooghly River is formed by the confluence of the Bhagirathi River and Ajay River at Katwa, and Hooghly has a number of tributaries of its own. The Hooghly River empties into the Bay of Bengal near Sagar Island. Between Malda and the Bay of Bengal, the Hooghly river passes the towns and cities of Murshidabad, Nabadwip, Kolkata and Howrah.

After entering Bangladesh, the main branch of the Ganges river is known as the Padma. The Padma is joined by the Jamuna River, the largest distributary of the Brahmaputra. Further downstream, the Padma joins the Meghna River, the converged flow of Surma-Meghna River System taking on the Meghna's name as it enters the Meghna Estuary, which empties into the Bay of Bengal. Here it forms the  Bengal Fan, the world's largest submarine fan, which alone accounts for 10–20% of the global burial of organic carbon.

It stretches  along the Bay of Bengal.

Only the Amazon and Congo rivers have a greater average discharge than the combined flow of the Ganges, the Brahmaputra, and the Surma-Meghna river system. In full flood only the Amazon is larger.

Geology
The Indian subcontinent lies atop the Indian tectonic plate, a minor plate within the Indo-Australian Plate. Its defining geological processes commenced seventy-five million years ago, when, as a part of the southern supercontinent Gondwana, it began a northeastwards drift—lasting fifty million years—across the then unformed Indian Ocean. The subcontinent's subsequent collision with the Eurasian Plate and subduction under it, gave rise to the Himalayas, the planet's highest mountain ranges. In the former seabed immediately south of the emerging Himalayas, plate movement created a vast trough, which, having gradually been filled with sediment borne by the Indus and its tributaries and the Ganges and its tributaries, now forms the Indo-Gangetic Plain.

The Indo-Gangetic Plain is geologically known as a foredeep or foreland basin.

Hydrology

Major left-bank tributaries include the Gomti River, Ghaghara River, Gandaki River and Kosi River; major right-bank tributaries include the Yamuna River, Son River, Punpun and Damodar. The hydrology of the Ganges River is very complicated, especially in the Ganges Delta region. One result is different ways to determine the river's length, its discharge, and the size of its drainage basin.

The name Ganges is used for the river between the confluence of the Bhagirathi and Alaknanda rivers, in the Himalayas, and the first bifurcation of the river, near the Farakka Barrage and the India-Bangladesh Border. In these cases the river's source is usually assumed to be the source of the Bhagirathi River, Gangotri Glacier at Gomukh and its mouth being the mouth of the Meghna River on the Bay of Bengal. Sometimes the source of the Ganges is considered to be at Haridwar, where its Himalayan headwater streams debouch onto the Gangetic Plain.

For similar reasons, sources differ over the size of the river's drainage basin. The basin covers parts of four countries, India, Nepal, China, and Bangladesh; eleven Indian states, Himachal Pradesh, Uttarakhand, Uttar Pradesh, Madhya Pradesh, Chhattisgarh, Bihar, Jharkhand, Punjab, Haryana, Rajasthan, West Bengal, and the Union Territory of Delhi. The combined Ganges-Brahmaputra-Meghna basin (abbreviated GBM or GMB) drainage basin is spread across Bangladesh, Bhutan, India, Nepal, and China.

The Ganges basin ranges from the Himalaya and the Transhimalaya in the north, to the northern slopes of the Vindhya range in the south, from the eastern slopes of the Aravalli in the west to the Chota Nagpur plateau and the Sunderbans delta in the east. A significant portion of the discharge from the Ganges comes from the Himalayan mountain system. Within the Himalaya, the Ganges basin spreads almost 1,200 km from the Yamuna-Satluj divide along the Simla ridge forming the boundary with the Indus basin in the west to the Singalila Ridge along the Nepal-Sikkim border forming the boundary with the Brahmaputra basin in the east. This section of the Himalaya contains 9 of the 14 highest peaks in the world over 8,000m in height, including Mount Everest which is the high point of the Ganges basin. The other peaks over 8,000m in the basin are Kangchenjunga, Lhotse, Makalu, Cho Oyu, Dhaulagiri, Manaslu, Annapurna and Shishapangma. The Himalayan portion of the basin includes the south-eastern portion of the state of Himachal Pradesh, the entire state of Uttarakhand, the entire country of Nepal and the extreme north-western portion of the state of West Bengal.

The discharge of the Ganges also differs by source. Frequently, discharge is described for the mouth of the Meghna River, thus combining the Ganges with the Brahmaputra and Meghna.

The maximum peak discharge of the Ganges, as recorded at Hardinge Bridge in Bangladesh, exceeded .

The hydrologic cycle in the Ganges basin is governed by the Southwest Monsoon. About 84% of the total rainfall occurs in the monsoon from June to September. Consequently, streamflow in the Ganges is highly seasonal. The average dry season to monsoon discharge ratio is about 1:6, as measured at Hardinge Bridge. This strong seasonal variation underlies many problems of land and water resource development in the region. The seasonality of flow is so acute it can cause both drought and floods. Bangladesh, in particular, frequently experiences drought during the dry season and regularly suffers extreme floods during the monsoon.

In the Ganges Delta, many large rivers come together, both merging and bifurcating in a complicated network of channels. The two largest rivers, the Ganges and Brahmaputra, both split into distributary channels, the largest of which merge with other large rivers before themselves joining the Bay of Bengal. But this current channel pattern was not always the case. Over time the rivers in Ganges Delta have often changed course, sometimes altering the network of channels in significant ways.

Before the late 12th century the Bhagirathi-Hooghly distributary was the main channel of the Ganges and the Padma was only a minor spill-channel. The main flow of the river reached the sea not via the modern Hooghly River but rather by the Adi Ganga. Between the 12th and 16th centuries, the Bhagirathi-Hooghly and Padma channels were more or less equally significant. After the 16th century, the Padma grew to become the main channel of the Ganges. It is thought that the Bhagirathi-Hooghly became increasingly choked with silt, causing the main flow of the Ganges to shift to the southeast and the Padma River. By the end of the 18th century, the Padma had become the main distributary of the Ganges. One result of this shift to the Padma was that the Ganges now joined the Meghna and Brahmaputra rivers before emptying into the Bay of Bengal. The present confluence of the Ganges and Meghna was formed very recently, about 150 years ago.

Also near the end of the 18th century, the course of the lower Brahmaputra changed dramatically, significantly altering its relationship with the Ganges. In 1787 there was a great flood on the Teesta River, which at the time was a tributary of the Ganges-Padma River. The flood of 1787 caused the Teesta to undergo a sudden change course, an avulsion, shifting east to join the Brahmaputra and causing the Brahmaputra to shift its course south, cutting a new channel. This new main channel of the Brahmaputra is called the Jamuna River. It flows south to join the Ganges-Padma. During ancient times, the main flow of the Brahmaputra was more easterly, passing by the city of Mymensingh and joining the Meghna River. Today this channel is a small distributary but retains the name Brahmaputra, sometimes Old Brahmaputra. The site of the old Brahmaputra-Meghna confluence, in the locality of Langalbandh, is still considered sacred by Hindus. Near the confluence is a major early historic site called Wari-Bateshwar.

In the rainy season of 1809, the lower channel of the Bhagirathi, leading to Kolkata, had been entirely shut; but in the following year it opened again and was nearly of the same size as the upper channel but both however suffered a considerable diminution, owing probably to the new communication opened below the Jalanggi on the upper channel.

History
The first European traveller to mention the Ganges was the Greek envoy Megasthenes (ca. 350–290 BCE). He did so several times in his work Indica: "India, again, possesses many rivers both large and navigable, which, having their sources in the mountains which stretch along the northern frontier, traverse the level country, and not a few of these, after uniting with each other, fall into the river called the Ganges. Now this river, which at its source is 30 stadia broad, flows from north to south, and empties its waters into the ocean forming the eastern boundary of the Gangaridai, a nation which possesses a vast force of the largest-sized elephants." (Diodorus II.37).

In 1951 a water sharing dispute arose between India and East Pakistan (now Bangladesh) after India declared its intention to build the Farakka Barrage. East Pakistan objected and a protracted dispute ensued. In 1996 a 30-year treaty was signed with Bangladesh. The terms of the agreement are complicated, but in essence, they state that if the Ganges flow at Farakka was less than  then India and Bangladesh would each receive 50% of the water, with each receiving at least  for alternating ten-day periods. However, within a year the flow at Farakka fell to levels far below the historic average, making it impossible to implement the guaranteed sharing of water. In March 1997, flow of the Ganges in Bangladesh dropped to its lowest ever, . Dry season flows returned to normal levels in the years following, but efforts were made to address the problem. One plan is for another barrage to be built in Bangladesh at Pangsha, west of Dhaka. This barrage would help Bangladesh better utilize its share of the waters of the Ganges.

Religious and cultural significance

Embodiment of sacredness

The Ganges is a sacred river to Hindus along every fragment of its length. All along its course, Hindus bathe in its waters, paying homage to their ancestors and their gods by cupping the water in their hands, lifting it, and letting it fall back into the river; they offer flowers and rose petals and float shallow clay dishes filled with oil and lit with wicks (diyas). On the journey back home from the Ganges, they carry small quantities of river water with them for use in rituals; Ganga Jal, literally "the water of the Ganges".

The Ganges is the embodiment of all sacred waters in Hindu mythology. Local rivers are said to be like the Ganges and are sometimes called the local Ganges. The Godavari River of Maharashtra in Western India is called the Ganges of the South or the 'Dakshin Ganga'; the Godavari is the Ganges that was led by the sage Gautama to flow through Central India. The Ganges is invoked whenever water is used in Hindu ritual and is therefore present in all sacred waters. Despite this, nothing is more stirring for a Hindu than a dip in the actual river, which is thought to remit sins, especially at one of the famous tirthas such as Gangotri, Haridwar, Triveni Sangam at Allahabad, or Varanasi. The symbolic and religious importance of the Ganges is one of the few things that Hindus, even their skeptics, have agreed upon. Jawaharlal Nehru, a religious iconoclast himself, asked for a handful of his ashes to be thrown into the Ganges. "The Ganga", he wrote in his will, "is the river of India, beloved of her people, round which are intertwined her racial memories, her hopes and fears, her songs of triumph, her victories and her defeats. She has been a symbol of India's age-long culture and civilization, ever-changing, ever-flowing, and yet ever the same Ganga."

Avatarana - Descent of Ganges

In late May or early June every year, Hindus celebrate the karunasiri and the rise of the Ganges from earth to heaven. The day of the celebration, Ganga Dashahara, the Dashami (tenth day) of the waxing moon of the Hindu calendar month Jyestha, brings throngs of bathers to the banks of the river. A dip in the Ganges on this day is said to rid the bather of ten sins (dasha = Sanskrit "ten"; hara = to destroy) or ten lifetimes of sins. Those who cannot journey to the river, however, can achieve the same results by bathing in any nearby body of water, which, for the true believer, takes on all the attributes of the Ganges.

The karunasiri is an old theme in Hinduism with a number of different versions of the story. In the Vedic version, Indra, the Lord of Swarga (Heaven) slays the celestial serpent, Vritra, releasing the celestial liquid, soma, or the nectar of the gods which then plunges to the earth and waters it with sustenance.

In the Vaishnava version of the myth, the heavenly waters were then a river called Vishnupadi (Sanskrit: "from the foot of Vishnu"). As Lord Vishnu as the avatar Vamana completes his celebrated three strides —of earth, sky, and heaven— he stubs his toe on the vault of heaven, punches open a hole and releases the Vishnupadi, which until now had been circling the cosmic egg. Flowing out of the vault, she plummets down to Indra's heaven, where she is received by Dhruva, once a steadfast worshipper of Vishnu, now fixed in the sky as the Pole star. Next, she streams across the sky forming the Milky Way and arrives on the moon. She then flows down earthwards to Brahma's realm, a divine lotus atop Mount Meru, whose petals form the earthly continents. There, the divine waters break up, with one stream, the Bhagirathi, flowing down one petal into Bharatvarsha (India) as the Ganges.

It is Shiva, however, among the major deities of the Hindu pantheon, who appears in the most widely known version of the avatarana story. Told and retold in the Ramayana, the Mahabharata and several Puranas, the story begins with a sage, Kapila, whose intense meditation has been disturbed by the sixty thousand sons of King Sagara. Livid at being disturbed, Kapila sears them with his angry gaze, reduces them to ashes, and dispatches them to the netherworld. Only the waters of the Ganges, then in heaven, can bring the dead sons their salvation. A descendant of these sons, King Bhagiratha, anxious to restore his ancestors, undertakes rigorous penance and is eventually granted the prize of Ganges's descent from heaven. However, since her turbulent force would also shatter the earth, Bhagiratha persuades Shiva in his abode on Mount Kailash to receive the Ganges in the coils of his tangled hair and break her fall. The Ganges descends is tamed in Shiva's locks, and arrives in the Himalayas. She is then led by the waiting Bhagiratha down into the plains at Haridwar, across the plains first to the confluence with the Yamuna at Prayag and then to Varanasi, and eventually to Ganges Sagar (Ganges delta), where she meets the ocean, sinks to the netherworld, and saves the sons of Sagara. In honour of Bhagirath's pivotal role in the avatarana, the source stream of the Ganges in the Himalayas is named Bhagirathi, (Sanskrit, "of Bhagiratha").

Redemption of the Dead

As the Ganges had descended from heaven to earth, she is also considered the vehicle of ascent, from earth to heaven. As the Triloka-patha-gamini, (Sanskrit: triloka= "three worlds", patha = "road", gamini = "one who travels") of the Hindu tradition, she flows in heaven, earth, and the netherworld, and, consequently, is a "tirtha" or crossing point of all beings, the living as well as the dead. It is for this reason that the story of the avatarana is told at Shraddha ceremonies for the deceased in Hinduism, and Ganges water is used in Vedic rituals after death. Among all hymns devoted to the Ganges, there are none more popular than the ones expressing the worshipper's wish to breathe his last surrounded by her waters. The Gangashtakam expresses this longing fervently:O Mother! ... Necklace adorning the worlds!Banner rising to heaven!I ask that I may leave of this body on your banks,Drinking your water, rolling in your waves,Remembering your name, bestowing my gaze upon you.
No place along her banks is more longed for at the moment of death by Hindus than Varanasi, the Great Cremation Ground, or Mahashmshana. Those who are lucky enough to die in Varanasi, are cremated on the banks of the Ganges, and are granted instant salvation. If the death has occurred elsewhere, salvation can be achieved by immersing the ashes in the Ganges. If the ashes have been immersed in another body of water, a relative can still gain salvation for the deceased by journeying to the Ganges, if possible during the lunar "fortnight of the ancestors" in the Hindu calendar month of Ashwin (September or October), and performing the Shraddha rites.

Hindus also perform pinda pradana, a rite for the dead, in which balls of rice and sesame seed are offered to the Ganges while the names of the deceased relatives are recited. Every sesame seed in every ball thus offered, according to one story, assures a thousand years of heavenly salvation for each relative. Indeed, the Ganges is so important in the rituals after death that the Mahabharata, in one of its popular ślokas, says, "If only (one) bone of a (deceased) person should touch the water of the Ganges, that person shall dwell honoured in heaven." As if to illustrate this truism, the Kashi Khanda (Varanasi Chapter) of the Skanda Purana recounts the remarkable story of Vahika, a profligate and unrepentant sinner, who is killed by a tiger in the forest. His soul arrives before Yama, the Lord of Death, to be judged for the afterworld. Having no compensating virtue, Vahika's soul is at once dispatched to hell. While this is happening, his body on earth, however, is being picked at by vultures, one of whom flies away with a foot bone. Another bird comes after the vulture, and in fighting him off, the vulture accidentally drops the bone into the Ganges below. Blessed by this event, Vahika, on his way to hell, is rescued by a celestial chariot which takes him instead to heaven.

The Purifying Ganges

Hindus consider the waters of the Ganges to be both pure and purifying.  Regardless of all scientific understanding of its waters, the Ganges is always ritually and symbolically pure in Hindu culture.  Nothing reclaims order from disorder more than the waters of the Ganga.  Moving water, as in a river, is considered purifying in Hindu culture because it is thought to both absorb impurities and take them away.  The swiftly moving Ganga, especially in its upper reaches, where a bather has to grasp an anchored chain to not be carried away, is especially purifying.  What the Ganges removes, however, is not necessarily physical dirt, but symbolic dirt; it wipes away the sins of the bather, not just of the present, but of a lifetime.

A popular paean to the Ganga is the Ganga Lahiri composed by a 17th-century poet Jagannatha who, legend has it, was turned out of his Hindu Brahmin caste for carrying on an affair with a Muslim woman. Having attempted futilely to be rehabilitated within the Hindu fold, the poet finally appeals to Ganga, the hope of the hopeless, and the comforter of last resort. Along with his beloved, Jagannatha sits at the top of the flight of steps leading to the water at the famous Panchganga Ghat in Varanasi. As he recites each verse of the poem, the water of the Ganges rises one step until in the end it envelops the lovers and carries them away.  "I come to you as a child to his mother", begins the Ganga Lahiri.  I come as an orphan to you, moist with love.I come without refuge to you, giver of sacred rest.I come a fallen man to you, uplifter of all.I come undone by disease to you, the perfect physician.I come, my heart dry with thirst, to you, ocean of sweet wine.Do with me whatever you will.

Consort, Shakti, and Mother
Ganga is a consort to all three major male deities of Hinduism.  As Brahma's partner she always travels with him in the form of water in his kamandalu (water-pot).  She is also Vishnu's consort.  Not only does she emanate from his foot as Vishnupadi in the avatarana story, but is also, with Sarasvati and Lakshmi, one of his co-wives.  In one popular story, envious of being outdone by each other, the co-wives begin to quarrel. While Lakshmi attempts to mediate the quarrel, Ganga and Sarasvati, heap misfortune on each other. They curse each other to become rivers, and to carry within them, by washing, the sins of their human worshippers. Soon their husband, Vishnu, arrives and decides to calm the situation by separating the goddesses. He orders Sarasvati to become the wife of Brahma, Ganga to become the wife of Shiva, and Lakshmi, as the blameless conciliator, to remain as his own wife. Ganga and Sarasvati, however, are so distraught at this dispensation, and wail so loudly, that Vishnu is forced to take back his words. Consequently, in their lives as rivers they are still thought to be with him.

It is Shiva's relationship with Ganga, that is the best-known in Ganges mythology.  Her descent, the avatarana is not a one-time event, but a continuously occurring one in which she is forever falling from heaven into his locks and being forever tamed.  Shiva, is depicted in Hindu iconography as Gangadhara, the "Bearer of the Ganga", with Ganga, shown as spout of water, rising from his hair.  The Shiva-Ganga relationship is both perpetual and intimate.  Shiva is sometimes called Uma-Ganga-Patiswara ("Husband and Lord of Uma (Parvati) and Ganga"), and Ganga often arouses the jealousy of Shiva's better-known consort.

Ganga is the shakti or the moving, restless, rolling energy in the form of which the otherwise recluse and unapproachable Shiva appears on earth.  As water, this moving energy can be felt, tasted, and absorbed.  The war-god Skanda addresses the sage Agastya in the Kashi Khand of the Skanda Purana in these words: One should not be amazed ... that this Ganges is really Power, for is she not the Supreme Shakti of the Eternal Shiva, taken in the form of water?This Ganges, filled with the sweet wine of compassion, was sent out for the salvation of the world by Shiva, the Lord of the Lords.Good people should not think this Triple-Pathed River to be like the thousand other earthly rivers, filled with water.

The Ganga is also the mother, the Ganga Mata (mata="mother") of Hindu worship and culture, accepting all and forgiving all.  Unlike other goddesses, she has no destructive or fearsome aspect, destructive though she might be as a river in nature.  She is also a mother to other gods.  She accepts Shiva's incandescent seed from the fire-god Agni, which is too hot for this world and cools it in her waters.  This union produces Skanda, or Kartikeya, the god of war.  In the Mahabharata, she is the wife of Shantanu, and the mother of heroic warrior-patriarch, Bhishma.  When Bhishma is mortally wounded in battle, Ganga comes out of the water in human form and weeps uncontrollably over his body.

The Ganges is the distilled lifeblood of the Hindu tradition, of its divinities, holy books, and enlightenment.  As such, her worship does not require the usual rites of invocation (avahana) at the beginning and dismissal (visarjana) at the end, required in the worship of other gods.  Her divinity is immediate and everlasting.

Ganges in classical Indian iconography

Early in ancient Indian culture, the river Ganges was associated with fecundity, its redeeming waters, and its rich silt providing sustenance to all who lived along its banks. A counterpoise to the dazzling heat of the Indian summer, the Ganges came to be imbued with magical qualities and to be revered in anthropomorphic form. By the 5th century CE, an elaborate mythology surrounded the Ganges, now a goddess in her own right, and a symbol for all rivers of India. Hindu temples all over India had statues and reliefs of the goddess carved at their entrances, symbolically washing the sins of arriving worshippers and guarding the gods within. As protector of the sanctum sanctorum, the goddess soon came to be depicted with several characteristic accessories: the makara (a crocodile-like undersea monster, often shown with an elephant-like trunk), the kumbha (an overfull vase), various overhead parasol-like coverings, and a gradually increasing retinue of humans.

Central to the goddess's visual identification is the makara, which is also her vahana, or mount. An ancient symbol in India, it pre-dates all appearances of the goddess Ganga in art. The makara has a dual symbolism. On the one hand, it represents the life-affirming waters and plants of its environment; on the other, it represents fear, both fear of the unknown which it elicits by lurking in those waters, and real fear which it instils by appearing in sight. The earliest extant unambiguous pairing of the makara with Ganga is at the Udayagiri Caves in Central India (circa 400 CE). Here, in the Cave V, flanking the main figure of Vishnu shown in his boar incarnation, two river goddesses, Ganga and Yamuna appear atop their respective mounts, makara and kurma (a turtle or tortoise).

The makara is often accompanied by a gana, a small boy or child, near its mouth, as, for example, shown in the Gupta period relief from Besnagar, Central India, in the left-most frame above. The gana represents both posterity and development (udbhava). The pairing of the fearsome, life-destroying makara with the youthful, life-affirming gana speaks to two aspects of the Ganges herself. Although she has provided sustenance to millions, she has also brought hardship, injury, and death by causing major floods along her banks. The goddess Ganga is also accompanied by a dwarf attendant, who carries a cosmetic bag, and on whom she sometimes leans, as if for support. (See, for example, frames 1, 2, and 4 above.)

The purna kumbha or full pot of water is the second most discernible element of the Ganga iconography. Appearing first also in the relief in the Udayagiri Caves (5th century), it gradually appeared more frequently as the theme of the goddess matured. By the 7th century it had become an established feature, as seen, for example, in the Dashavatara temple, Deogarh, Uttar Pradesh (7th century), the Trimurti temple, Badoli, Chittorgarh, Rajasthan, and at the Lakshmaneshwar temple, Kharod, Bilaspur, Chhattisgarh, (9th or 10th century), and seen very clearly in frame 3 above and less clearly in the remaining frames. Worshipped even today, the full pot is emblematic of the formless Brahman, as well as of woman, of the womb, and of birth. Furthermore, The river goddesses Ganga and Saraswati were both born from Brahma's pot, containing the celestial waters.

In her earliest depictions at temple entrances, the goddess Ganga appeared standing beneath the overhanging branch of a tree, as seen as well in the Udayagiri caves. However, soon the tree cover had evolved into a chatra or parasol held by an attendant, for example, in the 7th-century Dasavatara temple at Deogarh. (The parasol can be clearly seen in frame 3 above; its stem can be seen in frame 4, but the rest has broken off.) The cover undergoes another transformation in the temple at Kharod, Bilaspur (9th or 10th century), where the parasol is lotus-shaped, and yet another at the Trimurti temple at Badoli where the parasol has been replaced entirely by a lotus.

As the iconography evolved, sculptors, especially in central India, were producing animated scenes of the goddess, replete with an entourage and suggestive of a queen en route to a river to bathe. Following the iconographic prescription, she stands gracefully on her composite makara mount and holds a water pot. The dwarf attendant carries her cosmetic bag, and a ... female holds the stem of a giant lotus leaf that serves as her mistress's parasol. The fourth figure is a male guardian. Often in such reliefs, the makara tail is extended with great flourish into a scrolling design symbolizing both vegetation and water.

Kumbh Mela

Kumbh Mela is a mass Hindu pilgrimage in which Hindus gather at the Ganges River. The normal Kumbh Mela is celebrated every 3 years, the Ardh (half) Kumbh is celebrated every six years at Haridwar and Allahabad, the Purna (complete) Kumbh takes place every twelve years at four places (Triveni Sangam (Allahabad), Haridwar, Ujjain, and Nashik). The Maha (great) Kumbh Mela which comes after 12 'Purna Kumbh Melas', or 144 years, is held at Allahabad.

The major event of the festival is ritual bathing at the banks of the river. Other activities include religious discussions, devotional singing, mass feeding of holy men and women and the poor, and religious assemblies where doctrines are debated and standardized. Kumbh Mela is the most sacred of all the pilgrimages. Thousands of holy men and women attend, and the auspiciousness of the festival is in part attributable to this. The sadhus are seen clad in saffron sheets with ashes and powder dabbed on their skin per the requirements of ancient traditions. Some called naga sanyasis, may not wear any clothes.

Irrigation
The Ganges and its all tributaries, especially the Yamuna, have been used for irrigation since ancient times. Dams and canals were common in the Gangetic plain by the 4th century BCE. The Ganges-Brahmaputra-Meghna basin has a huge hydroelectric potential, on the order of 200,000 to 250,000 megawatts, nearly half of which could easily be harnessed. As of 1999, India tapped about 12% of the hydroelectric potential of the Ganges and just 1% of the vast potential of the Brahmaputra.

Canals

Megasthenes, a Greek ethnographer who visited India during the 3rd century BCE when Mauryans ruled India described the existence of canals in the Gangetic plain. Kautilya (also known as Chanakya), an advisor to Chandragupta Maurya, the founder of Maurya Empire, included the destruction of dams and levees as a strategy during the war. Firuz Shah Tughlaq had many canals built, the longest of which, was built in 1356 on the Yamuna River. Now known as the Western Yamuna Canal, it has fallen into disrepair and been restored several times. The Mughal emperor Shah Jahan built an irrigation canal on the Yamuna River in the early 17th century. It fell into disuse until 1830, when it was reopened as the Eastern Yamuna Canal, under British control. The reopened canal became a model for the Upper Ganges Canal and all following canal projects.

The first British canal in India (which did not have Indian antecedents) was the Ganges Canal built between 1842 and 1854.
Contemplated first by Col. John Russell Colvin in 1836, it did not at first elicit much enthusiasm from its eventual architect Sir Proby Thomas Cautley, who balked at the idea of cutting a canal through extensive low-lying land to reach the drier upland destination. However, after the Agra famine of 1837–38, during which the East India Company's administration spent Rs. 2,300,000 on famine relief, the idea of a canal became more attractive to the company's budget-conscious Court of Directors. In 1839, the Governor General of India, Lord Auckland, with the Court's assent, granted funds to Cautley for a full survey of the swath of land that underlay and fringed the projected course of the canal. The Court of Directors, moreover, considerably enlarged the scope of the projected canal, which, in consequence of the severity and geographical extent of the famine, they now deemed to be the entire Doab region.

The enthusiasm, however, proved to be short-lived. Auckland's successor as Governor-General, Lord Ellenborough, appeared less receptive to large-scale public works, and for the duration of his tenure, withheld major funds for the project. Only in 1844, when a new Governor-General, Lord Hardinge, was appointed, did official enthusiasm and funds return to the Ganges canal project. Although the intervening impasse had seemingly affected Cautley's health and required him to return to Britain in 1845 for recuperation, his European sojourn gave him an opportunity to study contemporary hydraulic works in the United Kingdom and Italy. By the time of his return to India even more supportive men were at the helm, both in the North-Western Provinces, with James Thomason as Lt. Governor, and in British India with Lord Dalhousie as Governor-General. Canal construction, under Cautley's supervision, now went into full swing. The Ganges Canal, which required a total capital outlay of £2.15 million, was officially opened in 1854 by Lord Dalhousie. According to historian Ian Stone: It was the largest canal ever attempted in the world, five times greater in its length than all the main irrigation lines of Lombardy and Egypt put together, and longer by a third than even the largest USA navigation canal, the Pennsylvania Canal.

Dams and barrages
A major barrage at Farakka was opened on 21 April 1975, It is located close to the point where the main flow of the river enters Bangladesh, and the tributary Hooghly (also known as Bhagirathi) continues in West Bengal past
Kolkata. Indo-Bangladesh Ganges Water Treaty signed in December 1996 addressed some of the water sharing issues between India and Bangladesh. There is Lav Khush Barrage across the River Ganges in Kanpur.

Tehri Dam was constructed on Bhagirathi River, a tributary of the Ganges. It is located 1.5 km downstream of Ganesh Prayag, the place where Bhilangana meets Bhagirathi. Bhagirathi is called the Ganges after Devprayag. Construction of the dam in an earthquake-prone area was controversial.

Bansagar Dam was built on the Sone River, a tributary of the Ganges for both irrigation and hydroelectric power generation. Ganges floodwaters along with Brahmaputra waters can be supplied to most of its right side basin area along with central and south India by constructing a coastal reservoir to store water on the Bay of Bengal sea area.

Economy

The Ganges Basin with its fertile soil is instrumental to the agricultural economies of India and Bangladesh. The Ganges and its tributaries provide a perennial source of irrigation to a large area. Chief crops cultivated in the area include rice, sugarcane, lentils, oil seeds, potatoes, and wheat. Along the banks of the river, the presence of swamps and lakes provides a rich growing area for crops such as legumes, chillies, mustard, sesame, sugarcane, and jute. There are also many fishing opportunities along the river, though it remains highly polluted. Also, the major industrial towns of Unnao and Kanpur, situated on the banks of the river with the predominance of tanning industries add to the pollution.

Tourism
Tourism is another related activity. Three towns holy to Hinduism—Haridwar, Allahabad (Prayagraj), and Varanasi—attract millions of pilgrims to its waters to take a dip in the Ganges, which is believed to cleanse oneself of sins and help attain salvation. The rapids of the Ganges are also popular for river rafting in the town of Rishikesh, attracting adventure seekers in the summer months. Several cities such as Kanpur, Kolkata and Patna have also developed riverfront walkways along the banks to attract tourists.

Ecology and environment

Human development, mostly agriculture, has replaced nearly all of the original natural vegetation of the Ganges basin. More than 95% of the upper Gangetic Plain has been degraded or converted to agriculture or urban areas. Only one large block of relatively intact habitat remains, running along the Himalayan foothills and including Rajaji National Park, Jim Corbett National Park, and Dudhwa National Park. As recently as the 16th and 17th centuries the upper Gangetic Plain harboured impressive populations of wild Asian elephants (Elephas maximus), Bengal tigers (Panthera t. tigris), Indian rhinoceros (Rhinoceros unicornis), gaurs (Bos gaurus), barasinghas (Rucervus duvaucelii), sloth bears (Melursus ursinus) and Indian lions (Panthera leo leo). In the 21st century there are few large wild animals, mostly deer, wild boars, wildcats, and small numbers of Indian wolves, golden jackals, and red and Bengal foxes. Bengal tigers survive only in the Sundarbans area of the Ganges Delta. The Sundarbands freshwater swamp ecoregion, however, is nearly extinct. The Sundarbans mangroves (Heritiera fomes) also grow in the Sundarbans area of the Ganges Delta. Threatened mammals in the upper Gangetic Plain include the tiger, elephant, sloth bear, and four-horned antelope (Tetracerus quadricornis).

Many types of birds are found throughout the basin, such as myna, Psittacula parakeets, crows, kites, partridges, and fowls. Ducks and snipes migrate across the Himalayas during the winter, attracted in large numbers to wetland areas. There are no endemic birds in the upper Gangetic Plain. The great Indian bustard (Ardeotis nigriceps) and lesser florican (Sypheotides indicus) are considered globally threatened.

The natural forest of the upper Gangetic Plain has been so thoroughly eliminated it is difficult to assign a natural vegetation type with certainty. There are a few small patches of forest left, and they suggest that much of the upper plains may have supported a tropical moist deciduous forest with sal (Shorea robusta) as a climax species.

A similar situation is found in the lower Gangetic Plain, which includes the lower Brahmaputra River. The lower plains contain more open forests, which tend to be dominated by Bombax ceiba in association with Albizzia procera, Duabanga grandiflora, and Sterculia vilosa. There are early seral forest communities that would eventually become dominated by the climax species sal (Shorea robusta) if forest succession was allowed to proceed. In most places forests fail to reach climax conditions due to human causes. The forests of the lower Gangetic Plain, despite thousands of years of human settlement, remained largely intact until the early 20th century. Today only about 3% of the ecoregion is under natural forest and only one large block, south of Varanasi, remains. The fauna of the lower Gangetic Plain is similar to the upper plains, with the addition of a number of other species such as the smooth-coated otter (Lutrogale perspicillata) and the large Indian civet (Viverra zibetha).

Fish

It has been estimated that about 350 fish species live in the entire Ganges drainage, including several endemics. In a major 2007–2009 study of fish in the Ganges basin (including the river itself and its tributaries, but excluding the Brahmaputra and Meghna basins), a total of 143 fish species were recorded, including 10 non-native introduced species. The most diverse orders are Cypriniformes (barbs and allies), Siluriformes (catfish) and Perciformes (perciform fish), each comprising about 50%, 23% and 14% of the total fish species in the drainage.

There are distinct differences between the different sections of the river basin, but Cyprinidae is the most diverse throughout. In the upper section (roughly equalling the basin parts in Uttarakhand) more than 50 species have been recorded and Cyprinidae alone accounts for almost 80% those, followed by Balitoridae (about 15.6%) and Sisoridae (about 12.2%). Typical genera approaching this altitude are Schizothorax, Tor, Barilius, Nemacheilus and Glyptothorax. About 100 species have been recorded from the middle section of the basin (roughly equalling the sections in Uttar Pradesh and parts of Bihar) and more than 55% of these are in family Cyprinidae, followed by Schilbeidae (about 10.6%) and Clupeidae (about 8.6%). The lower section (roughly equalling the basin in parts of Bihar and West Bengal) includes major floodplains and is home to almost 100 species. About 46% of these are in the family Cyprinidae, followed by Schilbeidae (about 11.4%) and Bagridae (about 9%).

The Ganges basin supports major fisheries, but these have declined in recent decades. In the Allahabad region in the middle section of the basin, catches of carp fell from 424.91 metric tons in 1961–1968 to 38.58 metric tons in 2001–2006, and catches of catfish fell from 201.35 metric tons in 1961–1968 to 40.56 metric tons in 2001–2006. In the Patna region in the lower section of the basin, catches of carp fell from 383.2 metric tons to 118, and catfish from 373.8 metric tons to 194.48. Some of the fish commonly caught in fisheries include catla (Catla catla), golden mahseer (Tor putitora), tor mahseer (Tor tor), rohu (Labeo rohita), walking catfish (Clarias batrachus), pangas catfish (Pangasius pangasius), goonch catfish (Bagarius), snakeheads (Channa), bronze featherback (Notopterus notopterus) and milkfish (Chanos chanos).

The Ganges basin is home to about 30 fish species that are listed as threatened with the primary issues being overfishing (sometimes illegal), pollution, water abstraction, siltation and invasive species. Among the threatened species is the critically endangered Ganges shark (Glyphis gangeticus). Several fish species migrate between different sections of the river, but these movements may be prevented by the building of dams.

Crocodilians and turtles

The main sections of the Ganges River are home to the gharial (Gavialis gangeticus) and mugger crocodile (Crocodylus palustris), and the Ganges delta is home to the saltwater crocodile (C. porosus). Among the numerous aquatic and semi-aquatic turtles in the Ganges basin are the northern river terrapin (Batagur baska; only in the lowermost section of the basin), three-striped roofed turtle (B. dhongoka), red-crowned roofed turtle (B. kachuga), black pond turtle (Geoclemys hamiltonii), Brahminy river turtle (Hardella thurjii), Indian black turtle (Melanochelys trijuga), Indian eyed turtle (Morenia petersi), brown roofed turtle (Pangshura smithii), Indian roofed turtle (Pangshura tecta), Indian tent turtle (Pangshura tentoria), Indian flapshell turtle (Lissemys punctata), Indian narrow-headed softshell turtle (Chitra indica), Indian softshell turtle (Nilssonia gangetica), Indian peacock softshell turtle (N. hurum) and Cantor's giant softshell turtle (Pelochelys cantorii; only in the lowermost section of Ganges basin). Most of these are seriously threatened.

Ganges river dolphin

The river's most famed faunal member is the freshwater Ganges river dolphin (Platanista gangetica gangetica), which has been declared India's national aquatic animal.

This dolphin used to exist in large schools near urban centres in both the Ganges and Brahmaputra rivers but is now seriously threatened by pollution and dam construction. Their numbers have now dwindled to a quarter of their numbers of fifteen years before, and they have become extinct in the Ganges' main tributaries. A recent survey by the World Wildlife Fund found only 3,000 left in the water catchment of both river systems.

The Ganges river dolphin is one of only five true freshwater dolphins in the world. The other four are the baiji (Lipotes vexillifer) of the Yangtze River in China, now likely extinct; the Indus River dolphin of the Indus River in Pakistan; the Amazon river dolphin of the Amazon River in South America; and the Araguaian river dolphin (not considered a separate species until 2014) of the Araguaia–Tocantins basin in Brazil. There are several marine dolphins whose ranges include some freshwater habitats, but these five are the only dolphins who live only in freshwater rivers and lakes.

Effects of climate change 
The Tibetan Plateau contains the world's third-largest store of ice. Qin Dahe, the former head of the China Meteorological Administration, said that the recent fast pace of melting and warmer temperatures will be good for agriculture and tourism in the short term; but issued a strong warning:

In 2007, the Intergovernmental Panel on Climate Change (IPCC), in its Fourth Report, stated that the Himalayan glaciers which feed the river were at risk of melting by 2035. The IPCC has now withdrawn that prediction, as the original source admitted that it was speculative and the cited source was not a peer-reviewed finding. In its statement, the IPCC stands by its general findings relating to the Himalayan glaciers being at risk from global warming (with consequent risks to water flow into the Gangetic basin). Many studies have suggested that climate change will affect the water resources in the Ganges river basin including increased summer (monsoon) flow, and peak runoff could result in an increased risk of flooding.

Pollution and environmental concerns

The Ganges suffers from extreme pollution levels, caused by the 400 million people who live close to the river. Sewage from many cities along the river's course, industrial waste and religious offerings wrapped in non-degradable plastics add large amounts of pollutants to the river as it flows through densely populated areas. The problem is exacerbated by the fact that many poorer people rely on the river on a daily basis for bathing, washing, and cooking. The World Bank estimates that the health costs of water pollution in India equal three percent of India's GDP. It has also been suggested that eighty percent of all illnesses in India and one-third of deaths can be attributed to water-borne diseases.

Varanasi, a city of one million people that many pilgrims visit to take a "holy dip" in the Ganges, releases around 200 million liters of untreated human sewage into the river each day, leading to large concentrations of fecal coliform bacteria. According to official standards, water safe for bathing should not contain more than 500 fecal coliforms per 100 ml, yet upstream of Varanasi's ghats the river water already contains 120 times as much, 60,000 fecal coliform bacteria per 100 ml.

After the cremation of the deceased at Varanasi's ghats, the bones and ashes are immersed into the Ganges. However, in the past thousands of uncremated bodies were thrown into the Ganges during cholera epidemics, spreading the disease. Even today, holy men, pregnant women, people with leprosy or chicken pox, people who have been bitten by snakes, people who have committed suicide, the poor, and children under 5 are not cremated at the ghats but are left to float free, to decompose in the waters. In addition, those who cannot afford the large amount of wood needed to incinerate the entire body, leave behind a lot of half-burned body parts.

After passing through Varanasi, and receiving 32 streams of raw sewage from the city, the concentration of fecal coliforms in the river's waters rises from 60,000 to 1.5 million, with observed peak values of 100 million per 100 ml. Drinking and bathing in its waters therefore carries a high risk of infection.

Between 1985 and 2000, Rs. 10 billion, around US$226 million, or less than 4 cents per person per year, were spent on the Ganga Action Plan, an environmental initiative that was "the largest single attempt to clean up a polluted river anywhere in the world". The Ganga Action Plan has been described variously as a "failure", a "major failure".

According to one study, The Ganga Action Plan, which was taken on priority and with much enthusiasm, was delayed for two years. The expenditure was almost doubled. But the result was not very appreciable. Much expenditure was done on political propaganda. The concerning governments and the related agencies were not very prompt to make it a success. The public of the areas was not taken into consideration. The release of urban and industrial wastes in the river was not controlled fully. The flowing of dirty water through drains and sewers were not adequately diverted. The continuing customs of burning dead bodies, throwing carcasses, washing of dirty clothes by washermen, and immersion of idols and cattle wallowing were not checked. Very little provision of public latrines was made and the open defecation of lakhs of people continued along the riverside. All these made the Action Plan a failure.

The failure of the Ganga Action Plan has also been variously attributed to "environmental planning without proper understanding of the human-environment interactions", Indian "traditions and beliefs", "corruption and a lack of technical knowledge" and "lack of support from religious authorities".

In December 2009 the World Bank agreed to loan India US$1 billion over the next five years to help save the river. According to 2010 Planning Commission estimates, an investment of almost Rs. 70 billion (Rs. 70 billion, approximately US$1.5 billion) is needed to clean up the river.

In November 2008, the Ganges, alone among India's rivers, was declared a "National River", facilitating the formation of a National Ganga River Basin Authority that would have greater powers to plan, implement and monitor measures aimed at protecting the river.

In July 2014, the Government of India announced an integrated Ganges-development project titled Namami Gange Programme and allocated  2,037 crore for this purpose. The main objectives of the Namami Gange project is to improve the water quality by the abatement of pollution and rejuvenation of river Ganga by creating infrastructures like sewage treatment plants, river surface cleaning, biodiversity conservation, afforestation, and public awareness.

In March 2017 the High Court of Uttarakhand declared the Ganges River a legal "person", in a move that according to one newspaper, "could help in efforts to clean the pollution-choked rivers".  , the ruling has been commented on in Indian newspapers to be hard to enforce, that experts do not anticipate immediate benefits, that the ruling is "hardly game changing", that experts believe "any follow-up action is unlikely", and that the "judgment is deficient to the extent it acted without hearing others (in states outside Uttarakhand) who have stakes in the matter."

The incidence of water-borne and enteric diseases—such as gastrointestinal disease, cholera, dysentery, hepatitis A and typhoid—among people who use the river's waters for bathing, washing dishes and brushing teeth is high, at an estimated 66% per year.

Recent studies by Indian Council of Medical Research (ICMR) say that the river is so full of killer pollutants that those living along its banks in Uttar Pradesh, Bihar, and Bengal are more prone to cancer than anywhere else in the country. Conducted by the National Cancer Registry Programme under the ICMR, the study throws up shocking findings indicating that the river is thick with heavy metals and lethal chemicals that cause cancer. According to Deputy Director-General of NCRP A. Nandkumar, the incidence of cancer was highest in the country in areas drained by the Ganges and stated that the problem would be studied deeply and with the findings presented in a report to the health ministry.

Apart from that, many NGOs have come forward to rejuvenate the river Ganges. Vikrant Tongad, an Environmental specialist from SAFE Green filed a petition against Simbhaoli Sugar Mill (Hapur UP) to NGT. NGT slapped a fine of Rs. 5 crores to Sugar Mill also, a fine of 25 Lakhs to Gopaljee Dairy for discharging untreated effluents into the Simbhaoli drain.

Water shortages
Along with ever-increasing pollution, water shortages are getting noticeably worse. Some sections of the river are already completely dry.

Mining
Illegal mining in the Ganges river bed for stones and sand for construction work has long been a problem in Haridwar district, Uttarakhand, where it touches the plains for the first time. This is despite the fact that quarrying has been banned in Kumbh Mela area zone covering 140 km2 area in Haridwar.

In Art and Literature
  A painting of the Ganges entering the plains near Haridwar by William Purser with a poetical illustration by Letitia Elizabeth Landon in Fisher's Drawing Room Scrap Book, 1838.
  A painting of the Ganges near Kahalgaon by J. M. W. Turner with a poetical illustration by Letitia Elizabeth Landon in Fisher's Drawing Room Scrap Book, 1839.

See also

 Environmental personhood
 Fair river sharing
 Ganga Pushkaram
 Gangaputra Brahmin
 Ganga Talao
 Ganga Lake (Mongolia)
 List of rivers by discharge
 List of rivers by length
 List of rivers of India
 Mahaweli Ganga
 National Waterway 1
 Pollution of the Ganges
 River bank erosion along the Ganges in Malda and Murshidabad districts
 Sankat Mochan Foundation
 Ganga (goddess)
 Peninsular River System

Notes

References

Sources

Further reading

 
 Christopher de Bellaigue, "The River" (the Ganges; review of Sunil Amrith, Unruly Waters: How Rains, Rivers, Coasts, and Seas Have Shaped Asia's History; Sudipta Sen, Ganges: The Many Pasts of an Indian River; and Victor Mallet, River of Life, River of Death: The Ganges and India's Future), The New York Review of Books, vol. LXVI, no. 15 (10 October 2019), pp. 34–36. "[I]n 1951 the average Indian [inhabitant of India] had access annually to 5,200 cubic meters of water. The figure today is 1,400 ... and will probably fall below 1,000 cubic meters – the UN's definition of 'water scarcity' – at some point in the next few decades. Compounding the problem of lower summer rainfall ... India's water table is in freefall [due] to an increase in the number of tube wells ... Other contributors to India's seasonal dearth of water are canal leaks [and] the continued sowing of thirsty crops" (p. 35.)

External links

 Ganga in the Imperial Gazetteer of India, 1909
 Melting Glaciers Threaten Ganga
 The impacts of water infrastructure and climate change on the hydrology of the Upper Ganga River Basin IWMI research report
 The Ganges: A Journey into India (NPR)
 Ganga River – The longest River Of India

 
.
International rivers of Asia
Rivers of Bangladesh
Rivers of India
Bangladesh–India border
Border rivers
Sacred rivers
Rivers of Bihar
Rivers of Jharkhand
Rivers of Delhi
Rivers of Uttarakhand
Rivers of Uttar Pradesh
Rivers of West Bengal
National symbols of India
Rigvedic rivers
Rivers in Buddhism
Environmental personhood
Braided rivers in India